Oxytenis modestia, the Costa Rica leaf moth, dead-leaf moth, or tropical American silkworm moth, is a species of moth in the family Saturniidae. It was first described by Pieter Cramer in 1780. It occurs from Guatemala to northern South America.

References

Oxyteninae
Moths described in 1780
Taxa named by Pieter Cramer